Love, Gloom, Cash, Love is the last album as leader by jazz pianist Herbie Nichols, featuring performances recorded in 1957 and released on the Bethlehem label in 1958. “Infatuation Eyes” is a solo piano piece paying tribute to Art Tatum, who died in November 1956.

Reception
The AllMusic review by Brian Beatty stated: "These performances may be less animated than Nichols' earlier sides as a leader, but that's not to suggest the pianist's writing or playing had become pedestrian or predictable... Nichols' complex melodies and solos shine that much brighter".

Track listing
All compositions by Herbie Nichols, except as indicated
 "Too Close for Comfort" (Jerry Bock, Larry Holofcener, George David Weiss) - 4:50 
 "Every Cloud" - 3:55 
 "Argumentative" - 3:40 
 "Love, Gloom, Cash, Love" - 4:21 
 "Portrait of Ucha" - 3:48 
 "Beyond Recall" - 4:36 
 "All the Way" (Sammy Cahn, Jimmy Van Heusen) - 4:28 
 "45 Degree Angle" - 4:40 (Denzil Best)
 "Infatuation Eyes" - 2:45
 "S'crazy Pad" - 4:06 
Recorded in New York City in November 1957

Personnel
Herbie Nichols - piano
George Duvivier - bass (tracks 1-8 & 10)
Dannie Richmond - drums (tracks 1-8 & 10)

References

Bethlehem Records albums
Herbie Nichols albums
1957 albums